Neville Alexander Crichton  is a New Zealand businessman who was also a competitor in Australasian motor and yacht racing.

Biography
Born in New Zealand in 1945, Crichton left school aged 14 and entered the automotive industry. In 1972, he opened a used car dealership.

In 1978, at the age of 29, he was diagnosed with throat cancer. Crichton underwent 30 operations and eventually had his voice-box and oesophagus removed. Doctors told him it was unlikely he would ever speak again, but he became one of the first people in the world to receive an artificial voice box during experimental surgery in Indianapolis. This would lead to his nickname of "Croaky".

In the early-1980s Crichton immigrated to Australia founding the Ateco Group that imports Alfa Romeo, Chery, Citroën, Ferrari, Foton, Great Wall Lotus, Maserati and SsangYong cars into Australia and New Zealand.

In the 1980s, Crichton was a regular competitor in Australian touring car racing. As well as racing full-time in the Australian Touring Car Championship driving a JPS Team BMW 635CSi in 1985 and a Tony Longhurst Racing Ford Sierra RS500 in 1989, Crichton competed at the Bathurst 1000 in 1986 for the Volvo Dealer Team, 1987 and 1988 for Dick Johnson Racing and at the 1987 Spa 24 Hour for the Holden Dealer Team.

Crichton also had a distinguished yachting career, having owned ocean-racing yachts Alfa Romeo I, Alfa Romeo II and Alfa Romeo III. Crichton skipped the line honours winning yachts in the 2002 and 2009 Sydney to Hobart Yacht Races. He was also the founder of Alloy Yachts, which he incorporated with the same team that built his 28m sailing yacht Chanel in 1985.

In the 2012 Queen's Birthday and Diamond Jubilee Honours, Crichton was appointed a Companion of the New Zealand Order of Merit, for services to yachting and business. In 2015, he was inducted into the New Zealand Business Hall of Fame.

Career results

Australian Touring Car Championship
(key) (Races in bold indicate pole position) (Races in italics indicate fastest lap)

World Touring Car Championship
(key) (Races in bold indicate pole position) (Races in italics indicate fastest lap)

† Not registered for series & points

Bathurst 1000

Sandown endurance

Spa 24 Hours

Bathurst 12 Hour

References

Australian Touring Car Championship drivers
Companions of the New Zealand Order of Merit
Living people
New Zealand racing drivers
New Zealand male sailors (sport)
1945 births
Australian Endurance Championship drivers
Dick Johnson Racing drivers